Jacques Grippa (Grivegnée, 30 March 1913– Forest, August 30, 1990) was a Belgian politician, member of the resistance during World War II and communist.

Biography

Grippa was the son of the Italian immigrant Jean Grippa (1886-1945) and the Belgian woman Stéphanie Becco (1888-1935). In 1930 he studied for engineer at the University of Liège and became a member of the Belgian Communist Party.

During World War II, Grippa was a member of the resistance. In 1943 he was imprisoned as a political prisoner at Fort Breendonk. He was tortured, but refused to betray anybody and was therefore sent to Buchenwald.

After the war he became head of cabinet at the ministry of War Victims, where he oversaw the treatment of political prisoners. He was als chief of cabinet for Jean Borremans, who worked for the Communist Minister of Civil Works.

In 1962 he was removed from the Belgian Communist Party because he was more endeared to Maoism. Together with fellow former members he founded a new Marxist–Leninist party, but which quickly faded out after only a few years.

In 1964, as Secretary of the Central Committee of the Communist Party of Belgium, he visited China, delivering a speech at the Higher Party School of the Central Committee of the Communist Party of China.

References

1913 births
1990 deaths
Belgian people of Italian descent
Belgian communists
Belgian politicians
Walloon movement activists
Walloon people
Belgian resistance members
Breendonk prison camp survivors
Buchenwald concentration camp survivors